Niechlów  is a village in Góra County, Lower Silesian Voivodeship, in western Poland. It is the seat of the administrative district (gmina) called Gmina Niechlów.

References

Villages in Góra County